Rivers Arms is the second studio album by post-rock band Balmorhea, released by Western Vinyl on January 1, 2008, then re-released on February 12, 2008.  For this album, Aisha Burns, Erin Lance, and Jacob Glenn-Levin were recruited.

Track listing

Personnel
 Aisha Burns – violin
 Erin Lance – cello
 Jacob Glenn-Levin – guitar, bass
 Carl Saff – mastering

References 

2008 albums
Western Vinyl albums